Gregory Pepper is an indie pop artist based in Guelph, Ontario and signed to Fake Four Inc.

Discography

Albums
 Gregory Pepper & His Problems (2007)
 With Trumpets Flaring (2009)
 The Great Depression (2010) (with Factor, as Common Grackle)
 The Great Repression (2011) (as Common Grackle)
 Escape From Crystal Skull Mountain (2012)
 Big Huge Truck (2013) (with Madadam)
 CHORUS! CHORUS! CHORUS! (2015)
 Black Metal Demo Tape (2017)
 I Know Now Why You Cry (2020)

EPs
 How the Sick May Help Themselves (2005) (with The Dymaxions)
 My Bad EP (2014)
 GHOST (2016)

Podcasts
 Pep Talk! Episode 1 (2011)
 Pep Talk! Episode 2: Rejection (2012)
 Pep Talk! Episode 3: Return to Crystal Skull Mountain (2013)
 Pep Talk! Episode 4: Track (2013)

Guest appearances
 Noah23 – "Pinball" from Rock Paper Scissors (2008)
 Noah23 – "House on Wheels" from Upside Down Bluejay (2008)
 Awol One & Factor – "Back Then" from Owl Hours (2009)
 Factor – "Missed the Train" from Lawson Graham (2010)
 Noah23 – "When I'm Gone" from Fry Cook on Venus (2011)
 Sixo – "Daggers" from Tracking Perception EP (2012)
 Sixo – "Lord of the Flies" from Free Floating Rationales (2012)
 Factor – "Give Up" from Woke Up Alone (2013)

Production credits
 Noah23 – "Elephant March" & "Toy Story" from Rock Paper Scissors (2008)
 Noah23 – "House on Wheels" from Upside Down Bluejay (2008)
 Noah23 – "When I'm Gone" from Fry Cook on Venus (2011)
 The Main – all tracks on Clamnesia (2011)

See also
 Fake Four Inc.
 Canadian hip hop

References

External links
 
 Gregory Pepper & His Problems at Fake Four Inc.
 Gregory Pepper on Bandcamp
 

1982 births
Canadian indie pop musicians
Canadian male rappers
Underground rappers
Living people
Musicians from Guelph
Canadian songwriters
21st-century Canadian rappers
21st-century Canadian male musicians